The Afghanistan cricket team toured the West Indies in June 2017 to play three One Day Internationals (ODIs), three Twenty20 Internationals (T20Is) and a tour match. It was Afghanistan's first bilateral tour against a full member nation other than Zimbabwe. Originally the tour was going to consist of five ODIs and three T20Is. The West Indies won the T20I series 3–0. The ODI series was drawn 1–1 after the final match was washed out with no result.

Squads

Tour match

T20I series

1st T20I

2nd T20I

3rd T20I

ODI series

1st ODI

2nd ODI

3rd ODI

References

External links
 Series home at ESPN Cricinfo

2017 in Afghan cricket
2017 in West Indian cricket
International cricket competitions in 2017
Afghan cricket tours of the West Indies